USCT Port, also known as USCT PAD, is a Senegalese basketball team based in Dakar. It currently plays in the Nationale 1, after promoting from the second division in 2021. It is the basketball team of the Autonomous Port of Dakar.

Honours
Nationale 2
Champions (1): 2021

References

External links
Official Facebook

Sport in Dakar
Basketball teams established in 1962
Basketball teams in Senegal